Ruby Falls is a series of underground cascading waterfalls totaling  in Lookout Mountain, near Chattanooga, Tennessee, in the United States.

Geology
About 300 to 360 million years ago (in the Carboniferous Period, at the end of the Paleozoic Era), the eastern Tennessee area was covered with a shallow sea, the sediments of which eventually formed limestone rock.  About 200 million years ago, this area was uplifted, forming Lookout Mountain and nearby ridges. Slightly acidic groundwater running through cracks in the limestone slowly dissolved the relatively soluble rock, causing narrow cracks to widen into passages. This process, called chemical weathering, caused various caves to form inside Lookout Mountain.

Among them were Lookout Mountain Cave, which opened to the outside, and Ruby Falls Cave, which did not. The two were unconnected until developers joined them to create Lookout Mountain Caverns. Ruby Falls Cave is the upper of the two and contains a variety of geological formations and curiosities that Lookout Mountain Cave does not have.

Ruby Falls Cave features many of the more well-known types of cave formations (or speleothems) including stalactites and stalagmites, columns, drapery, and flowstone. The limestone in which the cave is formed is still relatively horizontal, just as it was deposited below sea level. 

The Falls are located at the end of the main passage of Ruby Falls Cave, in a large vertical shaft.  The stream, 1,120 feet underground, is fed both by rainwater and natural springs. It collects in a pool in the cave floor and then continues through the mountain until finally joining the Tennessee River at the base of Lookout Mountain.

History

Ruby Falls Cave has no natural openings. It was discovered in 1928, and so lacks various artifacts often associated with caves in the southeastern United States.  

In 1905, the natural entrance to Lookout Mountain Cave was closed during the construction of a railway tunnel.  In the 1920s, a chemist and cave enthusiast named Leo Lambert thought that he could re-open the cave as a tourist attraction, and formed a company to do so.  He planned to make an opening farther up the mountain than the original opening and transport tourists to the cave via an elevator.  For this purpose, his company purchased land on the side of Lookout Mountain above Lookout Mountain Cave and in 1928 began to drill through the limestone.  In doing so, they discovered a small passageway about 18 inches high and four feet wide. Exploring this opening, Lambert discovered the formerly hidden Ruby Falls Cave and its waterfall.  On his next trip to visit the cave, Lambert took his wife Ruby, and told her that he would name the falls after her.

After the discovery of the cave housing Ruby Falls, the tunnelers kept digging to locate the original cave they were searching for, the Lookout Mountain caverns, which they reached 1,120 feet underground. On December 30, 1929 the Lookout Mountain caverns were open to the public, and by the following year in June the Ruby Falls cave was expanded and opened as well. By 1935 the lower of the two caves was blocked off due to Ruby Falls being the far more popular of the two caves.

In 1954, the pathway around the basin was cut in order to allow tourists a better view of the falls. This began the tour-related quip regarding not drinking the falls' water. Though pure and thus safe to drink, it has large concentrations of magnesium from the strata of the mountain, which makes it a natural laxative.

In 1975, the secondary exit from the falls to the base of the mountain was cut. This was to comply with recreation regulations in Tennessee. The secondary exit is used in the event that the main shaft elevator fails.  This secondary exit was used for the popular Ruby Falls Haunted Cavern until 2017 when the event was renamed Dread Hollow and was moved to a new location. The haunted attraction is open to the public from late September, through October.

In April 2007, the National Speleological Society (NSS) published "Caves of Chattanooga" by Larry E. Matthews.  Chapter 3, "Ruby Falls Cave", covers the history of Ruby Falls Cave from its discovery in 1928 through 2007 (includes 23 illustrations).  Chapter 1, "Lookout Mountain Cave", covers the cave Leo Lambert was drilling for when he accidentally discovered Ruby Falls Cave.

Tourism and advertising

Lambert decided to open both caves to the public, although Lookout Mountain Cave was closed in 1935 since it was not very popular with tourists, who were much more impressed with the upper cave. Public tours began in 1930.  Electric lights were installed in the cave, making it one of the first commercial caves to be so outfitted. A large amount of billboards along I-75 in the 1970s and 1980s were present with the words "SEE RUBY FALLS" beginning hundreds of miles north and south of the falls itself. Ruby Falls remains a staple of Chattanooga tourism, operating daily.

Ruby Falls and the larger Lookout Mountain Caverns complex have been designated a National Historic Landmark. It is often associated with the nearby Rock City attraction, which lies atop Lookout Mountain.

Popular culture references
Johnny Cash and Roy Orbison co-wrote a song with the title "See Ruby Fall" in the mid to late 1960s, a reference to the barn roof advertising slogan "See Ruby Falls" ubiquitous throughout the southern United States in the mid 20th Century.

See also
 Cloudland Canyon State Park

Notes

External links

 Ruby Falls Official Website
 City of Lookout Mountain, TN
 Dread Hollow
 Lookout Mountain Information

Protected areas of Hamilton County, Tennessee
Caves of Tennessee
Limestone caves
Lookout Mountain
Show caves in the United States
Waterfalls of Tennessee
Landforms of Hamilton County, Tennessee
Historic districts on the National Register of Historic Places in Tennessee
National Register of Historic Places in Hamilton County, Tennessee
Subterranean waterfalls